The Kanazawa Evergreen football program, established in 1981, represents Kanazawa University in college football. Kanazawa is a member of the Hokuriku Collegiate American Football League.

External links
 

American football teams established in 1981
American football in Japan
1981 establishments in Japan
Hokuriku Collegiate American Football League